Volodymyr Polikarpenko (born June 9, 1972) is a Ukrainian retired athlete. Born in Zaporizhzhia, he competed in triathlon.

Polikarpenko competed at the first Olympic triathlon at the 2000 Summer Olympics. He took fifteenth place with a total time of 1:49:51.78. In the second Olympic triathlon at the 2004 Summer Olympics, he placed thirtieth with a total time of 1:57:39.28. For the 2008 Summer Olympic games, Polikarpenko placed 35th with a final time of 1:52:51.74. He was fifth at the 2006 Lausanne world championships.
Living in Turin, Italy for ten years, he won The Bardolino classic race in Italy for six years in a row, from 2001 to 2006

References

1972 births
Living people
Ukrainian male triathletes
Olympic triathletes of Ukraine
Triathletes at the 2000 Summer Olympics
Triathletes at the 2004 Summer Olympics
Triathletes at the 2008 Summer Olympics
Sportspeople from Zaporizhzhia
20th-century Ukrainian people
21st-century Ukrainian people